Teenage Dream may refer to:

Music

Albums
Teenage Dream (IQU album), 2000
Teenage Dream (Katy Perry album), 2010
Teenage Dream, a 1990 EP by Thrilled Skinny
Teenage Dream a 1998 album by Michiyo Heike
Teenage Dreams, a 2005 album by Daniel O'Donnell

Songs
"Teenage Dream" (T. Rex song), 1974
"Teenage Dream" (Katy Perry song), 2010
"Teenage Dream", a 1957 song by Terry Dene
"Teenage Dreams", a 1960 song by Dave Sampson
"Teenage Dream", a 1974 song by The Rubettes from Wear It's 'At
"Teenage Dream", a 1982 song by The Damned from the "Lively Arts" single
"Teenage Dream", a 1992 song by Mr. Children from Kind of Love
"Teenage Dream", a 1994 song by Seikima-II from Ponk!!
"Teenage Dream", a 1995 song by Deen
 "TeenageDream", a 2012 song by Mykki Blanco from Cosmic Angel: The Illuminati Prince/ss

Other uses 
Flying (1986 film), released on video as Teenage Dream, a drama film directed by Paul Lynch

See also
Teen Dream (disambiguation)